This is a list of Southern rock bands that fall into one of the following four categories, with a sign denoting them as such following the description.

 Traditional or mainstream Southern rock bands *
 Southern metal bands **
 Bands (rock or hard rock) that cite Southern rock influence ♪
 Bands that may not necessarily be traditional southern rock, but fuse qualities of Southern rock with another genre, making a sort of sub-subgenre Alt. Southern Rock. These fusions include but are not limited to: country, bluegrass, blues, blues rock, boogie woogie, etc. ♫

0–9
.38 Special *

A

A Thousand Horses *
Alabama *
Alabama Shakes *
Allen Collins Band *
Allman Brothers Band *
Artimus Pyle Band *
Atlanta Rhythm Section *
The Avett Brothers ♫

B
Band of Horses ♫
Barefoot Jerry *
Bellamy Brothers*
Black Oak Arkansas *
The Black Crowes *
Blackberry Smoke *
Blackfoot */**
BlackHawk ♫
Black Stone Cherry **
Bo Bice ♫
Bottle Rockets*

C
The Cadillac Three *
Charlie Daniels Band *
Chris Robinson Brotherhood *
Confederate Railroad *
Corrosion of Conformity **
Cowboy *
Creedence Clearwater Revival *
Cross Canadian Ragweed*

D
Danny Joe Brown * 
David Allan Coe ♪
The Derek Trucks Band *
Dickey Betts *
Dixie Dregs *
Doc Holliday *
Down **
Drive-By Truckers *
Drivin N Cryin *

E
Elvin Bishop *

F
The Fabulous Thunderbirds *

G
The Georgia Satellites * 
Gov't Mule *
Grant Lee Buffalo *
Gregg Allman Band *
Grinderswitch *

H
Henry Paul Band

I

J
J.J. Cale *
Jackyl *
JJ Grey & MOFRO *
Jason Isbell & the 400 Unit *
Jimbo Mathus *

K
The Kentucky Headhunters *
Kings of Leon*

L
Legendary Shack Shakers ♫ 
Leon Russell *
Little Texas *
Lonnie Mack * 
Lynyrd Skynyrd *

M
Mama's Pride *
Marcus King Band *
Marshall Tucker Band *
Maylene and the Sons of Disaster **
Molly Hatchet */**
Mudcrutch

N
Nantucket *
Needtobreathe *
Norma Jean **
North Mississippi Allstars *

O
Omar & The Howlers *
Outlaws *
Ozark Mountain Daredevils *

P
Pimpadelic ♫
Point Blank *
Potliquor *

R
 
The Radiators *
Ram Jam *
The Rossington Band * **
The Rossington-Collins Band *
The Rounders *
Royal Southern Brotherhood *

S

Saving Abel **
Sea Level *
Sister Hazel *
Shooter Jennings *
The Showdown **
 Southern Culture on the Skids ♫
Steve Gaines *
Stevie Ray Vaughan & Double Trouble *
Stillwater *
The Supersuckers *
The Steel Woods *

T
Tedeschi Trucks Band *
Texas Hippie Coalition **
Third Day *
Tom Petty and The Heartbreakers *
Tony Joe White *
Toy Caldwell *
Travis Tritt *

U

V
Van Zant *

W
Warren Haynes*
Wet Willie *
Webb Wilder *
Whiskey Falls *
Whiskey Myers*
Widespread Panic *
Will Hoge *
Hank Williams Jr *
The Word *

Z
ZZ Top *

References

Southern rock
Southern rock